Judge Young may refer to:

Don John Young (1910–1996), judge of the United States District Court for the Northern District of Ohio
George C. Young (1916–2015), judge of the United States District Courts for the Northern, Middle, and Southern Districts of Florida
George M. Young (1870–1932), judge of the United States Customs Court
Gordon Elmo Young (1907–1969), judge of the United States District Court for the Eastern District of Arkansas
James Scott Young (1848–1914), judge of the United States District Court for the Western District of Pennsylvania
Joseph H. Young (1922–2015), judge of the United States District Court for the District of Maryland
Richard L. Young (born 1953), judge of the United States District Court for the Southern District of Indiana
Roderick C. Young (born 1966), judge of the United States District Court for the Eastern District of Virginia
William G. Young (born 1940), judge of the United States District Court for the District of Massachusetts

See also
John Milton Younge (born 1955), judge of the United States District Court for the Eastern District of Pennsylvania
Justice Young (disambiguation)